Enguerrand de Monstrelet (c. 140020 July 1453) was a French chronicler. He was born in  Picardy, most likely into a family of the minor nobility.

Life
In 1436 and later he held the office of lieutenant of the gavenier (i.e. receiver of the gave, a kind of church rate) at Cambrai, and he seems to have made this city his usual place of residence. He was for some time bailiff of the cathedral chapter and then provost of Cambrai. He was married and left some children when he died.

Little else is known about Monstrelet except that he was present, not at the capture of Joan of Arc, but at her subsequent interrogation with Philip the Good, Duke of Burgundy. Continuing the work of Froissart, Monstrelet wrote a Chronique, which extends to two books and covers the period between 1400 and 1444, when, according to another chronicler, Mathieu d'Escouchy, he ceased to write. In these can be found his commentary on the Battle of Tannenburg (1410) between the Teutonic Order and the Polish-Lithuanian and allied armies, where he stated that the King of Poland "had just recently pretended to become a Christian in order to win the Polish Crown". But following a custom which was by no means uncommon in the Middle Ages, a clumsy sequel, extending to 1516, was formed out of various chronicles and tacked onto his work.

Monstrelet's own writings, dealing with the latter part of the Hundred Years' War, are valuable because they contain a large number of authentic documents and reported speeches. The author, however, shows little power of narration; his work, although clear, is dull. His somewhat ostentatious assertions of impartiality do not cloak a marked preference for the Burgundians in their struggle with France.

Among many editions of the Chronique may be mentioned those of J.-A. Buchon (1826) and the one edited for the Société de I'histoire de France by M Douet d'Arcq (Paris, 1857–1862). See Auguste Molinier, Les Sources de I'histoire de France, vols. IV and V (Paris, 1904).

Works

Tome 1 1857
Tome 2 1858
Tome 3 1859
Tome 4 1860
Tome 5 1861
Tome 6 1862

References

Sources

External links

The Chronicles of Enguerrand de Monstrelet, translated by Thomas Johnes, vol. 1 (1840), vol. 2 (1849) on Google Books.

1400 births
1453 deaths
People from Picardy
15th-century French historians